The Downs Link is a  footpath and bridleway linking the North Downs Way at St. Martha's Hill in Surrey with the South Downs Way near Steyning in West Sussex and on via the Coastal Link to Shoreham-by-Sea.

History 

For much of its route, the Downs Link follows the course of two dismantled railways - the Cranleigh Line and the Steyning Line - both of which closed in the 1960s as a result of the Beeching Axe. Between 1965 and 1970 the track was lifted and much of the track ballast was removed. The coppiced woodland along many of the cuttings and embankment sides remained unmanaged until 2 April 1970 when ownership of much of the track was sold by the British Railways Board to Surrey County Council and Hambledon Rural District Council (which became Waverley Borough Council in 1974) for £17,500. The local authorities managed the land until 1984, clearing scrub to allow the general public to use it as a recreational facility.

The Link was opened on 9 July 1984 by the Mayor of Waverley, Anne Hoath, at Baynard's station; it subsequently received a commendation in the National Conservation Award Scheme jointly organised by The Times newspaper and the Royal Institution of Chartered Surveyors.

Status 
The Downs Link is not a National Trail within the meaning of the National Parks and Access to the Countryside Act 1949, but a trail of regional importance supported by three local authorities - Surrey County Council, West Sussex County Council and Waverley Borough Council.

Former missing sections

Christ's Hospital to Slinfold
For many years, the route of the Link deviated from the original railway alignment between Slinfold and Christ's Hospital, near Horsham, where a section of the old line had been sold to an adjacent landowner. Attempts to establish a right of way across this section were resisted by the owner, resulting in the re-routing of the Link via Mill Lane, Itchingfield. The "Missing Link" campaign began in 1999 to create a green corridor as a safer alternative to the hazardous stretch of road.

In 2011, Christ's Hospital purchased a  section of the old line from Christ's Hospital station to the A264 Five Oaks Road near Slinfold. Works were carried out to repair two bridges, clear vegetation, provide a hard surface and drainage and repair the disused platform at Christ's Hospital station. An official ceremony took place on 11 September 2020 to mark the opening of the new section. Following the works during the winter of 2019/2020, the new section opened in April 2020, allowing off-road route access from the former Cranleigh/Guildford platform to Station Road to the east of the station via a winding path which passes beneath the Arun Valley Line. In July 2020, the local signposts at Baystone Bridge, at the western end of the new alignment, had not been changed to update the route to include this section but were still directing Downslink users onto the road.

Others
Another missing section in the Downs Link was filled in April 2007 with the granting of a new right of way from Baystone Bridge, along the route of the old railway line, to a point near Christ's Hospital station.

During the winter of 2019/2020, an improved alignment was created in Southwater to the west of Worthing Road as part of the construction of the Broadacres housing estate. The works involved a better delineation of the Link combined with improved drainage, landscaping and surfacing improvements.

See also
 Betley Bridge
 St Swithun's Way

References

External links 

 West Sussex County Council Page
 Downs Link Information Leaflet
 Downs Link Six Stage Route Guide (2020)
 Downs Link: A Six Stage Route Guide (2010)
 Downs Link: A Six Stage Route Guide (2003)

Rail trails in England
Long-distance footpaths in England
Footpaths in Surrey
Footpaths in West Sussex